The 2019 Pan American Wrestling Championships was held in Buenos Aires, Argentina, from 19 to 21 April 2019.

The top three countries in the 18 weight categories scheduled to be held at the 2019 Pan American Games (also in Lima) will qualify for the Pan American Games. If Peru has not qualified at the end of the 2019 Pan American Championships, the third spot available at the tournament will be awarded to Peru.

The USA has become the first time in history that a team has won every gold in a freestyle style at the Pan Am Championships.

Medal table

Team ranking

Medalists

Men's freestyle

Men's Greco-Roman

Women's freestyle

Results

Men's freestyle

57 kg
April 21

61 kg
April 21
{|
|-
|

65 kg
April 21

70 kg
April 21
{|
|-
|

74 kg
April 21

79 kg
April 20
{|
|-
|

86 kg
April 21

92 kg
April 20
{|
|-
|

97 kg
April 21

125 kg
April 21

Men's Greco-Roman

55 kg
April 18
{|
|-
|

60 kg
April 18

63 kg
April 18
{|
|-
|

67 kg
April 18

72 kg
April 18
{|
|-
|

77 kg
April 19

82 kg
April 19
{|
|-
|

87 kg
April 19

97 kg
April 18

130 kg
April 18

Women's freestyle

50 kg
April 20

53 kg
April 20

55 kg
April 19
{|
|-
|

57 kg
April 20

59 kg
April 19
{|
|-
|

62 kg
April 20

65 kg
April 19
{|
|-
|

68 kg
April 20

72 kg
April 19
{|
|-
|

76 kg
April 20

See also
Wrestling at the 2019 Pan American Games – Qualification

References

External links
Official website

Pan America
Pan American Wrestling Championships
2019 Pan American Wrestling Championships
Sports competitions in Buenos Aires
Wrestling Championships
Qualification tournaments for the 2019 Pan American Games
Pan American Wrestling Championships
Pan American Wrestling Championships